The 1950 Michigan State Spartans football team represented Michigan State College as an indepdennt during the 1950 college football season. In their fourth season under head coach Clarence Munn, the Spartans compiled an 8–1 record and were ranked No. 8 in the final AP Poll.

Two Spartans received first-team honors on the 1950 College Football All-America Team. Fullback Sonny Grandelius received first-team honors from the Associated Press, International News Service, and Central Press Association, and end Dorne Dibble received the honors from the Football Writers Association of America.

The 1950 Spartans won their annual rivalry games against Notre Dame by a 36–33 score and against  Michigan by a 14–7 score. In intersectional play, the Spartans beat Oregon State (6–0), William & Mary (33-14), and Pittsburgh (19–0), but lost to Maryland (34–7).

Schedule

Game summaries

Michigan

Michigan, ranked No. 3 in the country, opened the 1950 season playing against Michigan State College in Ann Arbor. Though favored by two touchdowns, the Wolverines were upset by the Spartans 14–7. The defeat was Michigan's first loss in the opening game of a season since 1937. Michigan played most of the game without its leading player, Chuck Ortmann. Ortmann was injured while being tackled on a 35-yard kickoff return in the first quarter. On the next play, Ortmann dropped back to pass but fell to the ground and was unable to return to the game. Michigan State took a 7–0 lead in the first quarter on a touchdown run by Sonny Grandelius. Michigan tied the score in the third quarter on a touchdown pass from Don Peterson to Fred Pickard. Michigan's touchdown was set up when Frank Howell intercepted a Michigan State pass and returned it 32 yards to the Michigan State 20-yard line. In the fourth quarter, Michigan State returned a punt to the Michigan 19-yard line and scored on a run by Michigan State fullback Leroy Crane. Michigan drove to the Michigan State 10-yard line in the fourth quarter, but the drive ended when quarterback Bill Putich threw an interception.

See also
 1950 in Michigan

References

Michigan State
Michigan State Spartans football seasons
Michigan State Spartans football